Braddock, Dunn & McDonald, later known as BDM, then BDM International, was a technical services firm founded in 1959 in New York City. Its founders were Dr. Joseph V. Braddock, Dr. Bernard J. Dunn, and Dr. Daniel F. McDonald, who each received a PhD from Fordham University in the Bronx, New York.  In 1997, TRW purchased BDM, and in 2002 Northrop Grumman bought TRW.

Move to Texas
Within a year of its founding, the company moved to El Paso, Texas, to be close to the U.S. Army's Air Defense Center at Fort Bliss, Texas, the White Sands Missile Range in New Mexico, and Holloman Air Force Base, also in New Mexico. The founders offered their experience in missile guidance, applied optics, electronic instrumentation, and radiation physics to the U.S. Defense Department, primarily to the U.S. Army.

Williams hired
A few years later the three founders hired Earle Williams, an engineer with a degree from Auburn University in Alabama, who eventually became President and CEO. He led the company through a time of rapid growth and expansion. Among Williams's most significant decisions was to move BDM to the Virginia suburbs of Washington, D.C., a few miles west of the Pentagon. That location offered the company a better opportunity to compete for defense contracts than it could from El Paso. The corporation broadened its client base to include other military services, the Joint Chiefs of Staff, and other U.S. government organizations.

For the rest of its existence as a company it occupied a series of ever-larger office spaces in an unincorporated area known as Tysons Corner, Virginia, formed by the interchange of the newly completed Capital Beltway and Virginia Routes 7 and 123. Along with Western Union and Honeywell, BDM was one of the first firms to locate in the Westpark section of Tysons Corner, occupying buildings on Jones Branch Drive (ca. 1978) and Westbranch Drive (ca. 1980).

Rapid growth
The company grew rapidly, along with Tysons Corner. In the early 1960s Tysons Corner was a sleepy crossroads, but has since grown into a classic "edge city", and a home of many government and military contractors. Williams promoted the area as a suitable place for technology-oriented firms. Tysons Corner and the surrounding towns became the home of many of BDM's competitors, including Planning Research Corporation, DynCorp International, and CACI. Although all competed with BDM, in the buildup of defense budgets in the late 20th century, nearly all prospered. For a time, the press referred to these companies as "Beltway Bandits," because of their location near (mostly Virginia) interchanges of the Washington, D.C. circumferential freeway. Employees of those companies, including BDM President Earle Williams, took offense to that term. As the Virginia-based defense contractors lost their independence and were absorbed by large aerospace giants, the term fell from use.

Although the location of the headquarters of these defense contractors was part of an overall trend of movement to the suburbs beginning in the 1960s, BDM played a leading role in the specifics of this movement into the Virginia suburbs of Washington.

Community work
BDM's executives were also active in the local community. President Earle Williams served as Director of Wolftrap Foundation for the Performing Arts. BDM's Executive Vice President Stanley E. Harrison worked to strengthen the academic programs of George Mason University in Fairfax, VA. He later became the Provost of Shenandoah University in Winchester, VA.

Change in ownership
In 1988 BDM was purchased by Ford Aerospace and became a part of Ford Motor Company. In 1990 Ford Aerospace was sold to Loral and BDM was spun off to the Carlyle Group. In 1997 BDM was purchased by TRW, an aerospace systems and technical services company, which in turn was acquired by Northrop Grumman in 2002. Northrop Grumman maintains a major corporate facility in Tysons Corner to this day.

References

Defunct companies based in Texas